The following is a timeline of the presidency of Donald Trump during the second quarter of 2017, from April 1 to June 30, 2017. To navigate between quarters, see timeline of the Donald Trump presidency.

Overview

Economy

Real GDP growth increased at an annual rate of 2.6%, up from a slow 0.7% in the preceding quarter. This was due to a smaller decrease in private inventory investment, an acceleration in PCE, and an upswing in federal government spending. These gains were offset by decreases in exports and fixed investments. On June 30, 2017, the U.S. national debt stood at $19.84 trillion, representing a quarterly decline of approximately 0.01% and a decline of approximately 0.46% since President Trump's inauguration.

Public opinion

According to FiveThirtyEight, President Trump concluded this quarter with an approval rating of 39.9%, representing a quarterly decline of 0.6%, and a decline of 5.6% since his inauguration.

Timeline

April 2017

May 2017

June 2017

See also
 Presidential transition of Donald Trump
 First 100 days of Donald Trump's presidency
 List of executive actions by Donald Trump
 List of presidential trips made by Donald Trump (international trips)

References

2017 Q2
2017 Q2
Presidency of Donald Trump
April 2017 events in the United States
May 2017 events in the United States
June 2017 events in the United States
Articles containing video clips